William Salter (1804 – 22 December 1875) was an English portrait painter of the 19th century. His best known work was a painting of 83 people at a banquet in 1836 organised by the Duke of Wellington to celebrate their victory at the Battle of Waterloo. The painting is called The Waterloo Banquet 1836 and today is at Apsley House.

Biography
Salter was born in 1804 (baptised on 26 December 1804) and educated in Honiton, Devon. He was able to work in James Northcote's studios from 1822. Five years later he went on a Grand Tour to Italy. Unlike other grand tourers Salter took up employment as a professor at Florentine Academy of Fine Arts. Salter taught History Painting until 1833 when he returned to England.

His most famous work is The Waterloo Banquet (1836) in Apsley House, which depicts a commemorative banquet held by the Duke of Wellington at Apsley House on the anniversary of the Battle of Waterloo in 1836.

The painting of the Waterloo Banquet

The story is that Salter was on his horse in Hyde Park on 18 June when he happened to hear and then see the banquet in progress at the Duke of Wellington's house at Hyde Park Corner. He was so intrigued by the spectacle that he approached his patron with a proposal for a painting to capture the scene. His patron Lady Berghersh consented to approach the Duke with the proposal. The Duke was immediately against the idea as he considered Salter's immaturity would not be up to the complexity of the painting Salter was proposing. Lady Berghersh was the Duke's niece and she and the Duke were close and kept up a correspondence for many years. The Duke was persuaded and he gave Salter access to the room and ornaments so that he could get their likenesses.

The centrepiece of the banquet was a large centrepiece that is over a metre wide and over eight metres long. It was a present from the government of Portugal and was made from silver that came from melting down coins. The silver and gilt metalwork was designed by Domingos Antonio de Sequeira and shows the victories of the Napoleonic wars. This silverware and Salter's painting are both today at Apsley House.

Salter painted scores of military figures as preparation for the Waterloo banquet painting and many of these are now in the National Portrait Gallery. He worked on this painting for five years at his studio in Pall Mall persevering to obtain a sitting from the invitees. Each of the people in the painting was reported as a good likeness.

The banquet that is shown is the one in 1836 when King William IV attended. The King died the following year, but Lord Bathurst was included in the picture despite his having already died. Earlier banquets may have had even more invitees. All the field officers were invited and over the years some had already died. Others in the picture were William, King of the Netherlands, Charles Lennox, 4th Duke of Richmond, Hussey Vivian, 1st Baron Vivian, Major-General Sir Peregrine Maitland and Rowland Hill, 1st Viscount Hill. Other field officers there included Sir Frederick Adam, Sir Henry Askew Bt, General Sir Andrew Francis Barnard, Colonel Sempronius Stretton. and General Sir Henry Wyndham.

The King is sitting at Wellington's right as the Duke proposes a toast. The idea of choosing this moment is not by chance. Salter had a problem of composition as he had to deliver a good likeness of over eighty people. As a banquet usually would result in half of the people facing away from a viewer he chose this moment so that the celebrants could more naturally be displayed facing to the side as they sat in conversational groups.

The painting was engraved and was very popular. Tickets were sold to people who wanted to see the painting when it was exhibited in 1841. An 1846 engraving by William Greatbach of the painting also sold well. It was proposed in 1852 to purchase the painting from the artist by public subscription, however this failed to achieve its goal probably due to the Duke's death in September 1852. The painting remained unsold and passed down to Salter's heirs.

The painting is now displayed at Apsley House. The tradition of holding a banquet of the anniversary of the day of the battle still continues today.

Other work
His picture of Socrates before his Judges was painted whilst he was in Italy and is credited with his favourable reception in Florence and Padua.

In 1835, a new church was built in Honiton. Salter paid for and painted an altarpiece called Descent from the Cross for his hometown in 1838.

Salter was a lifelong member of the Florentine academy and he painted a range of subjects, but he is primarily known for his banquet painting and the related portraits. He, and his patron Lady Burghersh, exhibited at the British Institution and he joined the Society of British Artists in 1846. Salter died at his home in West Kensington on 22 December 1875. He is buried at Kensal Green Cemetery, London.

References

External links

National Portrait Gallery - Person - William Salter

1804 births
1875 deaths
19th-century English painters
English male painters
People from Honiton
Burials at Kensal Green Cemetery
19th-century English male artists